Pepe Escobar (born 1954) is a Brazilian journalist and geopolitical analyst. His column "The Roving Eye" for Asia Times regularly discusses the multi-national "competition for dominance over the Middle East and Central Asia."

Central Asia
In 2011, journalist Arnaud de Borchgrave described Escobar as "well known for breaking stories in the Arab and Muslim worlds." Escobar has reported extensively from Afghanistan and Pakistan. In August 2000, the Taliban arrested Escobar and two other journalists and confiscated their film, accusing them of taking photos at a soccer match. On August 30, 2001, his column in The Asia Times warned about the danger of Osama bin Laden in a piece that has been called "prophetic." Escobar's 2001 interview with Afghanistan's leading opposition commander against the Taliban Ahmad Shah Massoud was also widely quoted.

His October 26, 2001 piece for Asia Times, "Anatomy of a 'terrorist' NGO," described the history and methods of the Al Rashid Trust. This has been cited by researchers at the USAF Counterproliferation Center (2003), at Stanford University (2012), and in the 2006 book Alms for Jihad.

Pipelineistan

"Pipelineistan" is a term coined by Escobar to describe "the vast network of oil and gas pipelines that crisscross the potential imperial battlefields of the planet," particularly in Central Asia. Articles by Escobar about his "Pipelineistan" theory, many first published in TomDispatch, have been re-published in Al Jazeera, Grist, Mother Jones, The Nation, and elsewhere.

As Escobar argued in a 2009 article published by CBS News, running energy pipelines from the energy-rich nations near the Caspian Sea would let Europe be less dependent on the natural gas that it currently gets from Russia, and would potentially help the West rely less on OPEC. This situation results in an international conflict of interest over the region. Escobar has asserted that the West's war on terror is "always over energy."

Some writers have supported but others have criticized Escobar's "Pipelineistan" theory "that the bloodshed in Syria is simply another war over Middle Eastern energy resources." A recent (2021) scholarly critique of Escobar's theory that "oil and gas interests are central factors for understanding foreign intervention in Syria" concludes that Russia is more likely to be motivated by "regime consolidation." Others criticizing the theory state that "the timing is wrong" and that unless "Syria and Iraq stabilise, and political relations with Saudi Arabia and Iraq improve" any pipeline involving Syria remains a "pipe dream."

Libya
According to Arnaud De Borchgrave, during the 2011 Libyan Civil War Escobar wrote a piece "uncovering" the background of  Abdelhakim Belhaj, whose military leadership against Gaddafi was being aided by NATO, had trained with al-Qaeda in Afghanistan. According to Escobar's story, published by Asia Times on August 30, 2011, Belhaj's background was well-known to Western intelligence but had been concealed from the public.

Documents revealed by WikiLeaks in the 2012–13 Stratfor email leak show this story being shared by Stratfor employees as they review media articles on Libya.

Interviewed about his story by Radio New Zealand, Escobar warned that Belhaj and his close associates were fundamentalists whose goal was to impose Islamic law once they defeated Gaddafi. Escobar's story was further reported by others, including PBS and The New American.

Russia
The United States State Department's Global Engagement Center (GEC) has identified several outlets that publish or republish work by Escobar as being used by Russia for propaganda and disinformation. In 2020, the GEC stated that both the Strategic Culture Foundation (SCF) and Global Research, two online journals where Escobar's work has appeared, acted as pro-Russian propaganda sites. According to the GEC, "Pepe Escobar began writing articles for Global Research in 2005 and ten years later became an SCF author.

Escobar has also been a commentator for RT and Sputnik News; both outlets were highlighted in a 2022 GEC report as members of "Russia's disinformation and propaganda ecosystem." Ukrainian journalist Volodymyr Yermolenko describes Escobar as an example of "anti-Western intellectuals" hosted by RT, adding that Escobar suggests "dividing Ukraine between Poland and Russia."

In 2012, Jesse Zwick at The New Republic asked Escobar why he was willing to work with RT; Escobar replied, "I knew the Kremlin involvement, but I said, why not use it? After a few months, I was very impressed by the American audience. There are dozens of thousands of viewers. A very simple story can get 20,000 hits on YouTube. The feedback was huge.”

On February 25, 2022, the Spanish newspaper ABC criticized Escobar's Sputnik comments concerning Ukraine and other topics, calling them "the usual ones of Russian disinformation: 'Yankee' imperialism, NATO excesses, Russian victimization."

Bibliography
 Pepe Escobar (2007), Globalistan: How the Globalized World is Dissolving into Liquid War, Nimble Books.
 Pepe Escobar (2007), Red Zone Blues: A Snapshot of Baghdad During the Surge, Nimble Books.
 Pepe Escobar (2009), Obama Does Globalistan, Nimble Books.
 Pepe Escobar (2014), Empire of Chaos, Nimble Books.
 Pepe Escobar (2015), 2030, Nimble Books.
 Pepe Escobar (2016), 2030, suivi de Dialogues inactuels (Jorge Luis Borges), Éditions du Cercle.

References

External links 
Manning, D. & Cotton, M. 2007, 'Embedded with Power: An interview with Pepe Escobar' (part 1, part 2), Mediabite, no date.
 Articles at Asia Times
 Pepe Escobar at Telegram 
 Pepe Escobar at VK 

1954 births
Living people
Brazilian journalists
Brazilian people of Spanish descent